Ruppertshofen refers to several places in Germany:

Ruppertshofen, Baden-Württemberg
Ruppertshofen, Rhineland-Palatinate